Spirinchus is a genus of smelts (Osmeridae) from the North Pacific Ocean and adjacent streams.

Species
There are currently three recognized species in this genus:
 Spirinchus lanceolatus (Hikita, 1913)
 Spirinchus starksi (Fisk, 1913) (Night smelt)
 Spirinchus thaleichthys (Ayres, 1860) (Longfin smelt)

References

 

 
 
Extant Pliocene first appearances
Marine fish genera
Taxa named by David Starr Jordan
Taxa named by Barton Warren Evermann